Doug Guy (born 21 November 1929) is a former Australian rules footballer who played with Carlton in the Victorian Football League (VFL).

Notes

External links 

Doug Guy's profile at Blueseum

1929 births
Carlton Football Club players
Living people
Australian rules footballers from Victoria (Australia)